is a train station in Sakurai, Nara Prefecture, Japan.

Line
 Kintetsu Railway
 Osaka Line

Layout
This station has two side platforms a track each.

Adjacent stations

Railway stations in Nara Prefecture